Abbasabad (also Romanized as ‘Abbāsābād) is a village in Siyakh Darengun Rural District, in the Central District of Shiraz County, Fars Province, Iran. At the 2006 census, its population was 255, in 64 families.

References 

Populated places in Shiraz County